Axos is a village in the municipal unit Kyrros, Pella regional unit, Central Macedonia, Greece, 4 km from the city of Giannitsa and 52 km from Thessaloniki. The village is home to the football club Niki Axou. From Axos originates the footballer Marios Nikolaidis.

Populated places in Pella (regional unit)